ATMACA (Accipiter) is an all weather, long range, precision strike, anti-ship cruise missile, developed by Turkish missile manufacturer ROKETSAN. The Atmaca will enter service with the Turkish Navy to gradually replace the country's existing inventory of Harpoon missiles.

Development 
The program was initiated in 2009 when Turkey's Undersecretary For Defense Industries (SSM) signed a contract with Roketsan for designing a surface-to-surface cruise missile for the requirements of the Turkish Naval Forces. The prime contractor, Roketsan, started the design studies in September 2012, after receiving the results of its previous research and development contract with Turkey's Undersecretary For Defense Industries under the coordination of Navy Research Center Command (ARMERKOM). The missile is planned to be developed for multiplatforms, capable of launching not only from warships but also from submarines, aircraft, coastal batteries, including land-attack operations.

After completing various tests, first land-based firing of the Atmaca took place in March 2017. The serial production contract for Atmaca was signed between Roketsan and the Presidency of Defense Industry on 29 October 2018. The missile will be deployed to Turkish Navy's s, Istanbul-class frigates, G-class frigates and planned TF-2000 class destroyers.

Timeline 

 On 3 November 2019, the Turkish Naval Forces successfully conducted its first ship-launched firing from the Ada-class corvette  in the Black sea
 On 1 July 2020 the Atmaca missile successfully hit its target from a >200 km range
 On February 3, 2021, the Atmaca anti-ship missile successfully hit the target in the test fire with the  corvette using a "live warhead" in Sinop.
 In June 2021 the Atmaca missile successfully hit the ex-TCG Işın (A-589) ship under the certification test. Marking its start of its serial production.
In June 2021, the Atmaca completed 20 successful test firing and expected to be certified this year for Ada-class corvette.

Design 
The missile makes use of its global positioning system (GPS), inertial navigation system, barometric altimeter and radar altimeter to navigate towards its target, while its active radar seeker pinpoints the target with high precision. Its modern data-link provides ATMACA with the ability to 3D mission planning, update targets, reattack and terminate the mission. Missile is ultra sea-skimming as it approaches the target.

Operators 

 Turkish Navy

Future Operator 
 
Indonesian Navy - On 2 November 2022, Indonesia has signed a contract for the purchase of Atmaca missiles.

Possible sales 
 
Algerian National Navy – On 3 June 2022, it was revealed Algeria reported to acquire Atmaca missiles.

See also 
 Nirbhay
 BrahMos
 Naval anti ship missile -MR
 AGM-158C LRASM
 Saccade C-802
 Babur
 Exocet
 Switchblade Kh-35
 Harpoon
 Naval Strike Missile
 Robotsystem RBS-15
 MBDA Otomat
 Sea Eagle
 SSM-700K Haeseong
 Type 80 Air-to-Ship Missile
 Type 88 Surface-to-Ship Missile
 Type 90 Ship-to-Ship Missile
 Type 93 Air-to-Ship Missile
 Gabriel (missile)
 Hsiung Feng II
 ASM-3
 AS.34 Kormoran
ghadeer

References 

Anti-ship cruise missiles
Naval cruise missiles
Surface-to-surface missiles of Turkey
Weapons and ammunition introduced in 2021